The Botswanan long-eared bat (Laephotis botswanae) is a species of vesper bat in the family Vespertilionidae. It can be found in the following countries: Botswana, Democratic Republic of the Congo, Malawi, Namibia, South Africa, Tanzania, Zambia, and Zimbabwe. It is found in savanna and swamps.

References

Laephotis
Mammals described in 1971
Taxonomy articles created by Polbot
Bats of Africa